The BYD F6 is a midsize sedan produced by the Chinese manufacturer BYD.

Overview

The styling of the BYD F6 heavily resembles the North American seventh-generation Honda Accord with the front of a first-generation Saab 9-5 and the rear of a Mercedes-Benz S-Class (W221) and has three engines and two transmission options; a 5-speed manual or a 4-speed automatic, with both engines being Mitsubishi designs.

Plug-in Hybrid (F6DM)
At the 2008 North American International Auto Show, BYD showcased the F6DM, a plug-in hybrid concept variant of the F6.

The F6DM was introduced at the 2008 North American International Auto Show.

Based on the BYD F6, the F6DM was to use lithium iron phosphate battery, a type of li-ion battery sold under the "Ferrous" trade name, that can be recharged to 70 percent of capacity in 10 minutes. Iron-Phosphate Lithium-Ion batteries are claimed to be much safer than Cobalt-Oxide Lithium-Ion batteries, which have a history of causing fires in consumer electronic devices. 

BYD claimed that their test model was able to travel  on electric power before the gasoline engine was needed, and that the battery could be fully recharged from an outlet in nine hours.

References

External links

F6
Mid-size cars
Sedans
2010s cars
Cars of China

Cars introduced in 2008